Some Kind of Zombie is the fourth studio album released by Audio Adrenaline.

Concept

According to Audio Adrenaline, the album concept and its title song are based on the Scripture, specifically Colossians, Chapter 3, where it talks about "giving life over to God". The inspiration came from singer Mark Stuart's experience living with his missionary parents in Haiti, where voodoo is heavily practiced. According to Stuart, the message is that "you can be dead to your old self after becoming a new person through religion."

Recording

Some Kind of Zombie was recorded in 1997 at Ardent Recordings in Memphis and Shakin' Studios in Franklin. Recording was produced by John Hampton. Jason Latshaw and Matt Martone assisted as engineers. The LP was mixed by Skidd Mills. The album included a remix of the title song called "Some Kind of Zombie (Criscoteque Remix)", which was remixed by Scott Humphrey. This track is not available on the audiocassette release of the album. A "Chevette (Remix)" can be found on the compilation album WOW 1999.

The album is the first Audio Adrenaline album to feature new guitarist, Tyler Burkum. It is also the first album to officially list Ben Cissell as the band's drummer. Additionally, the song "Blitz" features members of Christian ska band The O.C. Supertones, including Matt Morginsky as a guest vocalist.

Critical reception

Some Kind of Zombie was well received by critics. John DiBiase, of Jesus Freak Hideout, gave the album 3.5 stars out of 5, calling it a "fantastic record and a must-listen for any Audio Adrenaline or modern rock fan." AllMusic's Stephen Thomas Erlewine gave the album 4 out of 5 stars writing that "the group improves with each record, delivering tougher, catchier riffs and sharper performances".

Commercial performance
The album peaked at No. 99 on Billboard 200.

Music videos

Audio Adrenaline recorded music videos for the songs "Some Kind of Zombie" and "Blitz".

Track listing

Notes
 appears on Hit Parade
 appears on Adios: The Greatest Hits

Personnel

Audio Adrenaline
 Mark Stuart - lead vocals
 Will McGinniss - bass, vocals, yak back
 Bob Herdman - guitar, keyboards, vocals
 Ben Cissell - drums, percussion
 Tyler Burkum - guitars, vocals

Additional musicians
 Matt Morginsky (from The O.C. Supertones) - guest vocal on "Blitz"
 Carlos Pennell - guitars on "Flicker"
 Barry Blair - guitars on "Some Kind of Zombie"
 Carl Marsh - string arrangements on "Some Kind of Zombie", "God-Shaped Hole", "People Like Me", "Original Species", and "New Body"
 Dave Chevalier (from The O.C. Supertones) - Tenor Sax on "Blitz"
 Darren Mettler (from The O.C. Supertones) - Trumpet on "Blitz"
 Dan Spencer (from The O.C. Supertones) - Trombone on "Blitz"
 Jeannette Sullivan - additional background vocals on "Flicker"

Production
 John Hampton - producer
 Eddie DeGarmo - executive producer
 Dan R. Brock - executive producer
 Skidd Mills - mixer
 Jason Latshaw - second engineer
 Matt Martone - second engineer
 John Falls - photography
 Rusty Rust - aluminum photography
 Kerri McKeehan Stuart - art direction
 Brad Talbott - illustration and design
 Scott Humphrey - producer of "Some Kind of Zombie (Criscoteque remix)"

References

1997 albums
Audio Adrenaline albums
ForeFront Records albums